Spider-Man: No Way Home is a 2021 American superhero film based on the Marvel Comics character Spider-Man, co-produced by Columbia Pictures and Marvel Studios and distributed by Sony Pictures Releasing. It is the sequel to Spider-Man: Homecoming (2017) and Spider-Man: Far From Home (2019), and the 27th film in the Marvel Cinematic Universe (MCU). The film was directed by Jon Watts and written by Chris McKenna and Erik Sommers, and stars Tom Holland as Peter Parker / Spider-Man alongside Zendaya, Benedict Cumberbatch, Jacob Batalon, Jon Favreau, Jamie Foxx, Willem Dafoe, Alfred Molina, Benedict Wong, Tony Revolori, Marisa Tomei, Andrew Garfield, and Tobey Maguire. In the film, Parker asks Dr. Stephen Strange (Cumberbatch) to use magic to make his identity as Spider-Man a secret again following its public revelation at the end of Far From Home. When the spell goes wrong, the multiverse is broken open which allows visitors from alternate realities to enter Parker's universe.

No Way Home premiered at the Fox Village Theatre in Los Angeles on December 13, 2021, and was theatrically released in the United States on December 17, as part of Phase Four of the MCU. The film received positive reviews from critics, who praised the story, direction, action sequences, and the cast's performances and chemistry. No Way Home has grossed over $1.9 billion worldwide, surpassing its predecessor as the highest-grossing film released by Sony Pictures. It became the highest-grossing film of 2021, the sixth-highest-grossing film of all time, the highest grossing Spider-Man film, and set several other box office records, including those for films released during the COVID-19 pandemic.

The film received a nomination for an Academy Award, three Nickelodeon Kids' Choice Awards (winning all of the categories), five Critics' Choice Super Awards (winning three), nine Saturn Awards (winning one), among several others, chiefly for the writing and technical achievement. No Way Home, did not qualify for  75th British Academy Film Awards, as it was not available on BAFTA's streaming service. As a part of  "Oscars Fan Favorite" contest for the 94th Academy Awards, the sequence where three Spider-Men teaming up was named one of the five finalists for Oscars Cheer Moment, finishing second, and being listed in the fourth to win the "Fan Favorite" contest, despite being considered as a clear favourite to win the contest. Apart from the technical aspects, both Holland and Garfield received accolades for their performances.

Accolades

Notes

References

External links 
 

Spider-Man: No Way Home
Marvel Cinematic Universe: Phase Four
Accolades
Accolades
Lists of accolades by film